The International Search And Rescue Competition (ISAR) is an annual contest for search and rescue teams from the Canadian Coast Guard Auxiliary and United States Coast Guard Auxiliary. They compete for the ISAR trophy. It is an opportunity for members of the Coast Guard Auxiliary from both countries to learn, share ideas, and have fun, while building public awareness about what they do.

Events include:
 search and rescue planning
 on-water search and rescue exercise
 search and rescue pump operation
 marlinspike and seamanship skills
 heaving line throwing
 shipboard damage control
 patching ruptured pipes

The seventh annual International Search and Rescue Competition, will be held in Portsmouth, Virginia in October 2006.

External links
 Ranoia, Carol (July 21, 2006) Military News. Cape May County Herald
 USCG Auxiliary articles on 2005 ISAR
 USCG Auxiliary articles on 2006 ISAR

Canadian Coast Guard
Rescue
United States Coast Guard